State-recognized tribes in the United States are organizations that identify as Native American tribes or heritage groups that do not meet the criteria for federally recognized Indian tribes but have been recognized by a process established under assorted state government laws for varying purposes. State recognition does not dictate whether or not they are recognized as Native American tribes by continually existing tribal nations.

In the late 20th century, some states have passed legislation that recognizes some tribes. Most such groups are located in the Eastern United States, including the three of largest state-recognized tribes in the US, the Lumbee Tribe of North Carolina, Echota Cherokee Tribe of Alabama, and the United Houma Nation of Louisiana, each of which has more than ten thousand members.

State recognition confers few benefits under federal law. It is not the same as federal recognition, which is the federal government's acknowledgment of a tribe as a dependent sovereign nation. Some states have provided laws related to state recognition that provide some protection of autonomy for tribes that are not recognized by the federal government. For example, in Connecticut, state law recognizing certain tribes also protects reservations and limited self-government rights for state-recognized tribes.

Such state recognition has at times been opposed by federally-recognized tribes. For instance, the Cherokee Nation, which enrolls proven descendants, opposes state-recognized tribes, as well as Cherokee heritage groups and others with no documented descent who claim Cherokee identity.

Other groups that identify as being Native American tribes but lack federal or state recognition are listed in the list of unrecognized tribes in the United States.

Many organizations try to assert that various congratulatory resolutions are recognition as a Native American tribe by a state; however, "Resolutions are statements of opinions and, unlike bills, do not have the force of law."

Description 
The United States Constitution, as interpreted by the Supreme Court, gives ultimate authority with regard to matters affecting the American Indian tribes to the United States federal governnment. Under US federal law and regulations, an American Indian tribe is a group of Native Americans with self-government authority. This defines those tribes recognized by the federal government.

By late 2007, about 16 states had recognized 62 tribes. Typically, the state legislature or state agencies involved in cultural or Native American affairs make the formal recognition by criteria they establish, often with Native American representatives, and sometimes based on federal criteria. Members of a state-recognized tribe are still subject to state law and government, and the tribe does not have sovereign control over its affairs. According to the National Conference of State Legislatures, only 14 states recognize tribes at the state level.

Under the United States Indian Arts and Crafts Act of 1990, members of state-recognized tribes are authorized to exhibit as identified Native American artists, as are members of federally recognized tribes.

Koenig and Stein have recommended the processes of North Carolina, South Carolina and Virginia, all established by laws passed by the state legislatures, as models worthy of other states to use as the basis for legislation related to recognition of Native American tribes. Statutes that clearly identify criteria for recognition or that explicitly recognize certain tribes remove ambiguity from their status.

List of state-recognized tribes 
By 2008 a total of 62 Native American tribes had been recognized by states. In 2021, 574 tribes had been recognized by the federal government, often as a result of the process of treaties setting up reservations in the 19th century.

The following is a list of tribes recognized by various states but not by the U.S. Bureau of Indian Affairs. Tribes originally recognized by states that have since gained federal recognition have been deleted from the list below. The list includes those state-recognized tribes that have petitioned for federal recognition and been denied.

Alabama 
By the Davis-Strong Act of 1984, the state established the Alabama Indian Affairs Commission to acknowledge and represent Native American citizens in the state. At that time, it recognized seven tribes that did not have federal recognition. The commission members, representatives of the tribes, have created rules for tribal recognition, which were last updated in 2003, under which three more tribes have been recognized.
 Cher-O-Creek Intra Tribal Indians.
 Cherokee Tribe of Northeast Alabama (formerly Cherokees of Jackson County, Alabama). Letter of Intent to Petition 09/23/1981; certified letter returned "not known" 11/19/1997.
 Cherokees of Southeast Alabama. Letter of Intent to Petition 05/27/1988; certified letter returned marked "deceased" 11/5/1997.
 Echota Cherokee Tribe of Alabama.
 Ma-Chis Lower Creek Indian Tribe of Alabama. Letter of Intent to Petition 06/27/1983. Declined to Acknowledge 08/18/1988 52 FR 34319, Denied federal recognition.
 MOWA Band of Choctaw Indians. Letter of Intent to Petition 05/27/1983. Final Determination to Decline to Acknowledge published 12/24/1997 62FR247:67398-67400; petitioner requested reconsideration from BIA 3/23/1998, denied federal recognition; decision effective 11/26/1999.
 Piqua Shawnee Tribe.
 Star Clan of Muscogee Creeks (formerly Lower Creek Muscogee Tribe East, Star Clan, Southeastern Mvskoke Nation, and Yufala Star Clan of Lower Muscogee Creeks).
 United Cherokee Ani-Yun-Wiya Nation (formerly United Cherokee Intertribal). Letter of Intent to Petition 11/08/2001.

Arkansas 
Arkansas has no office to manage Indian affairs and no state-recognized tribes.

Connecticut 
 Eastern Pequot Tribal Nation. 
 Eastern Pequot Indians of Connecticut. Letter of Intent to Petition 06/28/1978; Reconsidered final determination not to acknowledge became final and effective 10/14/2005 70 FR 60099.
 Paucatuck Eastern Pequot Indians of Connecticut. Letter of Intent to Petition 06/20/1989. Reconsidered final determination not to acknowledge became final and effective 10/14/2005 70 FR 60099.
 Golden Hill Paugussett. Final Determination Against Federal Acknowledgement of the Golden Hill Paugussett Tribe (2004)
 Schaghticoke Tribal Nation. Letter of Intent to Petition 9/27/2001. Letter of Intent to Petition 12/14/1981; Declined to acknowledge in 2002; Reconsidered final determination not to acknowledge became final and effective 10/14/2005 70 FR 60101. Also known as the Schaghticoke Indian Tribe.

Delaware 
 Lenape Indian Tribe of Delaware.
 Nanticoke Indian Association, Inc. Letter of Intent to Petition 08/08/1978; requested petition be placed on hold 3/25/1989 of limited applicability.

Florida 
Florida has an office to manage Indian affairs: Florida Governor's Council on Indian Affairs, Inc.

Florida has no state-recognized tribes.

Georgia 
In 2007, the state legislature formally recognized the following as American Indian tribes of Georgia:

 Cherokee of Georgia Tribal Council.
 Georgia Tribe of Eastern Cherokees. (I). Letter of Intent to Petition 01/09/1979; last submission February 2002; ready for Acknowledge review.
 Unrecognized tribes with the same name as Georgia Tribe of Eastern Cherokees, Inc. (II) and (III) exist.
 Lower Muskogee Creek Tribe. Letter of Intent to Petition 02/02/1972; Declined to Acknowledge 12/21/1981 (46 FR 51652). Denied federal recognition. Also known as Lower Muskogee Creek Tribe East of the Mississippi, Inc.

Illinois 
Illinois has no office to manage Indian affairs and no state-recognized tribes.

Kansas 
Kansas has an office to manage Indian affairs: the Joint Committee on State-Tribal Relations.

Kansas has no state-recognized tribes.

Louisiana 
The Louisiana Office of Indian Affairs oversees state–tribal relations. They maintain a list of federally and state-recognized tribes headquartered in Louisiana.

 Addai Caddo Tribe, also Adai Caddo Indians of Louisiana, Robeline, Louisiana. Recognized by the State of Louisiana in 1993. Letter of Intent to Petition 09/13/1993. Also Adais Caddo Indians, Inc.
 Bayou Lafourche Band of Biloxi-Chitimache Confederation of Muskogees, also Biloxi-Chitimacha Confederation of Muskogee, Denham Springs, Louisiana. Separated from United Houma Nation, Inc. Letter of Intent to Petition 10/24/1995. Recognized by the State of Louisiana in 2005.
 Choctaw-Apache Community of Ebarb, also the Choctaw-Apache Tribe of Ebarb, Zwolle, Louisiana. Recognized by the State of Louisiana in 1978. Letter of Intent to Petition 07/02/1978.
 Clifton-Choctaw, also the Clifton Choctaw Tribe of Louisiana, Clinton, Louisiana. Recognized by the State of Louisiana in 1978. Letter of Intent to Petition 03/22/1978. Also known as Clifton Choctaw Reservation Inc.
 Four Winds Tribe, Louisiana Cherokee Confederacy, also the Four Winds Cherokees, Oakdale, Louisiana. Recognized by the State of Louisiana in 1997.
 Grand Caillou/Dulac Band, also the Grand Caillou/Dulac Band of Biloxi Chitimacha Choctaw, Chauvin, Louisiana.
 Isle de Jean Charles Band, also the Jean Charles Choctaw Nation, Montegut, Louisiana
 Louisiana Choctaw Tribe, as the Louisiana Band of Choctaw, Ferriday, Louisiana
 Natchtoches Tribe of Louisiana, Campti, Louisiana Recognized by the State of Louisiana in 2017 Regular Session, HR227.
 Pointe-au-Chien Tribe, also Pointe-au-Chien Indian Tribe, Montegut, Louisiana. Separated from United Houma Nation, Inc. Letter of Intent to Petition 7/22/1996. Recognized by the State of Louisiana in 2004.
 United Houma Nation. Recognized by the State of Louisiana in 1972. Letter of Intent to Petition 07/10/1979; Proposed Finding 12/22/1994, 59 FR 6618. Denied federal recognition.

Maryland 
On January 9, 2012, for the first time the state-recognized two American Indian tribes under a process developed by the General Assembly; these were both Piscataway groups, historically part of the large Algonquian languages family along the Atlantic Coast. The Governor announced it to the Assembly by executive order.

 Accohannock Indian Tribe. Governor Larry Hogan formally recognized this group on December 19, 2017, through Executive Order 01.01.2017.31.
 Piscataway Conoy Tribe. It includes the following two sub-groups:
Piscataway Conoy Confederacy and Sub-Tribes
Cedarville Band of Piscataway Indians
3. Piscataway Indian Nation and Tayac Territory.

Massachusetts 
The Massachusetts Commission on Indian Affairs was created by a legislative act of the General Court of Massachusetts in 1974, with the purpose of helping tribes recognized or that will be recognized receive access to and assistance with various local and state agencies.  Two former state-recognized tribes, the Wampanoag Tribe of Gay Head and the Mashpee Wampanoag Tribe, have federal recognition as of 1987 and 2007, respectively.

 Nipmuc Nation. Letter of Intent to Petition 04/22/1980; Declined to acknowledge on 6/25/2004, 69 FR 35667.

Michigan 
As of 2014, Michigan has four State-recognized tribes.

 Burt Lake Band of Ottawa & Chippewa Indians.
 Grand River Band of Ottawa Indians.
 Mackinac Bands of Chippewa and Ottawa Indians.
 Swan Creek Black River Confederated Ojibwa Tribes of Michigan.

Mississippi 
The state of Mississippi has offered congratulatory resolutions to unrecognized organizations identifying as Native American descendants, such as the MS HR50 in which the legislators "commend and congratulate" Vancleave Live Oak Choctaw Tribe for recognition; however, no laws outline formal state-recognition for this or any other group by the State of Mississippi.

Mississippi has no office to manage Indian affairs and no state-recognized tribes.

Missouri 
Missouri has no office to manage Indian affairs and no state-recognized tribes.

New Jersey 
 Nanticoke Lenni-Lenape Tribal Nation. Letter of Intent to Petition 01/03/1992.
 Ramapough Lenape Nation.
 Powhatan Renape Nation.

New York 
The Tonawanda Band of Seneca and Tuscarora Nation are both recognized by the state of New York but also federally recognized.
 Unkechague Poosepatuck Tribe (Unkechaug Nation).

North Carolina 
 Coharie Intra-tribal Council, Inc. Letter of Intent to Petition 3/13/1981.
 Haliwa-Saponi Indian Tribe. Letter of Intent to Petition 1/27/1979. Notified of "obvious deficiencies" in federal recognition application
 Lumbee Tribe of North Carolina. (Lumbee Regional Development Association Inc., Lumbee Tribe). Letter of Intent to Petition 01/07/1980; determined ineligible to petition (SOL opinion of 10/23/1989). In 2009, Senate Indian Affairs Committee endorsed a bill that would grant federal recognition.<ref name="HR1385">"Virginia tribes take another step on road to federal recognition"  in '[Richmond Times-Dispatch, 28 October 2009.</ref>
 Meherrin Nation. State-recognized 1987.
 Occaneechi Band of the Saponi Nation. Letter of Intent to Petition 01/06/1995.
 Sappony (formerly known as Indians of Person County, North Carolina).
 Waccamaw-Siouan Tribe. Letter of Intent to Petition 06/27/1983; determined ineligible to petition (SOL opinion of 10/23/1989). Letter of Intent to Petition 10/16/1992; determined eligible to petition (SOL letter of 6/29/1995). Also known as Waccamaw Siouan Development Association.

 Ohio Ohio has no office to manage Indian affairs and no state-recognized tribes. Pennsylvania Pennsylvania has no office to manage Indian affairs and no state-recognized tribes. Rhode Island Rhode Island has no office to manage Indian affairs and no state-recognized tribes. South Carolina 
South Carolina recognizes three entities: "state-recognized tribes", "state-recognized groups", and "special interest organizations".  As of 2023, South Carolina recognizes nine tribes that are not recognized by the federal government.
 Beaver Creek Indians. Letter of Intent to Petition 01/26/1998. State-recognized tribe in 2006.
 Edisto Natchez Kusso Tribe of South Carolina. State-recognized tribe in 2010. Also known as Edisto Natchez-Kusso Indians (Four Holes Indian Organization).
 Pee Dee Indian Nation of Upper South Carolina. Letter of Intent to Petition 12/14/2005. State-recognized tribe in 2005.
 Pee Dee Indian Tribe. Letter of Intent to Petition 01/30/1995. State recognized in 2006. Formerly Pee Dee Indian Tribe of South Carolina (2005). Formerly Pee Dee Indian Association (1978). 
 Piedmont American Indian Association.
 The Santee Indian Organization. Letter of Intent to Petition 06/04/1979. State-recognized tribe in 2006.  Formerly White Oak Indian Community.
 Sumter Tribe of Cheraw Indians.
 The Waccamaw Indian People.
 The Wassamasaw Tribe of Varnertown Indians.

The South Carolina Commission for Minority Affairs also has recognized "state-recognized groups" and "special interest organizations" but these are not the same as the state-recognized tribes. In 2018, governor of South Carolina Henry McMaster signed legislation that stops the state from recognizing any additional Native American "groups". As of 2023, South Carolina recognizes four "state-recognized groups" and one "special interest organization". 

Chaloklowa Chickasaw Indian People. State-recognized group in 2005.
Eastern Cherokee, Southern Iroquois, and United Tribes of South Carolina. State-recognized group in 2005.
Natchez Tribe of South Carolina. State-recognized group in 2007. 
Pee Dee Indian Nation of Beaver Creek. State-recognized group in 2007.
Pine Hill Indian Community Development Initiative. State-recognized special interest organization in 2020.

 Texas Texas has no office to manage Indian affairs and no state-recognized tribes.The Texas state legislature often issues congratulatory resolutions that "commend" organizations, such one honoring the Mount Tabor Indian Community in 2017, "for its contributions to [the] state" and the Lipan Apache in 2019; however, this isn't the same as formal recognition of a tribe by a state. Texas Senate Bill 274 to formally recognize the Lipan Apache Tribe of Texas, introduced in January 2021, died in committee.

Texas has "no legal mechanism to recognize tribes."

 Vermont 
As of May 3, 2006, Vermont law 1 V.S.A §§ 851–853 recognizes Abenakis as Native American Indians, not the tribes or bands. However, on April 22, 2011, Vermont Governor Peter Shumlin signed legislative bills officially recognizing two Abenaki Bands. The four Abenaki state-recognized tribes are also known as the "Abenaki Alliance".

Elnu Abenaki Tribe. Recognition signed into statute April 22, 2011.
Nulhegan Band of the Coosuk Abenaki Nation. Recognition signed into statute April 22, 2011.
On May 7, 2012, Governor Shumlim signed legislative bills officially recognizing two more Abenaki Bands: 
 Koasek Abenaki Tribe. Also known as Traditional Koasek Abenaki Nation of the Koas.
 Missiquoi Abenaki Tribe. Also known as Missisquoi St Francis Sokoki Abenaki Nations. Petitioned for federal recognition, denied in 2007.

 Virginia 
Virginia has an office to manage Indian affairs: the Virginia Council on Indians. It is composed of 13 members - eight from Virginia tribes officially recognized by the Commonwealth, two members at-large from Indian population in Virginia, one from House of Delegates, one from Senate, and one from Commonwealth at-large.

Virginia has the following state-recognized tribes:
Cheroenhaka (Nottoway) Indian Tribe. Letter of Intent to Petition 12/30/2002. Receipt of Petition 12/30/2002. State-recognized 2010; in Courtland, Southampton County. Letter of intent to file for federal recognition 2017. Currently a bill is being sponsored. 
Mattaponi Indian Nation (a.k.a. Mattaponi Indian Reservation). Letter of Intent to Petition 04/04/1995. State-recognized 1983; in Banks of the Mattaponi River, King William County. The Mattaponi and Pamunkey have reservations based in colonial-era treaties ratified by the Commonwealth in 1658. Pamunkey Tribe's attorney told Congress in 1991 that the tribes state reservation originated in a treaty with the crown in the 17th century and has been occupied by Pamunkey since that time under strict requirements and following the treaty obligation to provide to the Crown a deer every year, and they've done that (replacing Crown with Governor of Commonwealth since Virginia became a Commonwealth).
Nottoway Indian Tribe of Virginia. Recognized 2010; in Capron, Southampton County.
Patawomeck Indian Tribe of Virginia. Recognized 2010; in Stafford County.

 Washington Washington has not formally recognized any tribes by statute. However, the state or preceding territorial government has been a party to treaties involving a number of tribes that are not federally recognized.Chinook Indian Tribe. Bay Center. Party to the Tansey Point Treaties

 West Virginia West Virginia has no office to manage Indian affairs and no state-recognized tribes. See also 
United States
 Federally recognized tribes (Lower 48 states)
 Federally recognized tribes in Alaska
 Unrecognized tribes, not recognized by state or federal governments
 Native Americans in the United States
 List of federally recognized tribes by state
 List of Indian reservations in the United States
 List of historical Indian reservations in the United States
 Outline of United States federal Indian law and policy
 National Park Service Native American Heritage Sites

Canada
 List of Indian reserves in Canada
 List of First Nations governments
 List of First Nations peoples

Related
Diplomatic recognition
List of states with limited recognition
List of historical unrecognized states and dependencies
Sovereignty
Tribal sovereignty

 Notes 

 References 

 Koenig, Alexa and Jonathan Stein (2008). Federalism and the State Recognition of Native American Tribes: A survey of State-Recognized Tribes and State Recognition Processes Across the United States. University of Santa Clara Law Review, Vol. 48.
 Sheffield, Gail (1998). Arbitrary Indian: The Indian Arts and Crafts Act of 1990. Norman: University of Oklahoma Press. .
 Constitution of the United States

 External sources 
 Miller, Mark Edwin.  Forgotten Tribes: Unrecognized Indians and the Federal Acknowledgment Process.  Lincoln: University of Nebraska Press, 2004.  Discusses the state recognition process, the experiences of several state-recognized tribes (the United Houma Nation of Louisiana, and the Tigua/Pueblo of Ysleta Del Sur and Alabama-Coushatta Tribes of Texas- the latter two are federally recognized), and the problems of non-federally acknowledged indigenous communities.
 Bates, Denise.  The Other Movement: Indian Rights and Civil Rights in the Deep South.''  Tuscaloosa: University of Alabama Press, 2011.  Details state recognition and the functioning of state Indian commissions in Alabama and Louisiana.
 Federalism and the State Recognition of Native American Tribes: A survey of State-Recognized Tribes and State Recognition Processes Across the United States
 "BIA list of petitioners for recognition by state as of 22 September 2008
 BIA status summary of petitions for recognition as of 15 February 2007"
 Testimony of Leon Jones, Principal Chief of the Eastern Band of Cherokee Indians, and Dan McCoy, Tribal Council Chairman, on the Indian Federal Recognition Administrative Procedures Act of 1999
 Joint resolution of the Cherokee Nation and the Eastern Band of Cherokee Indians opposing fabricated Cherokee "tribes" and "Indians" (acknowledges the United Keetoowah Band of Cherokee Indians)
 U.S. GAO - Indian Issues: Federal Funding for Non-Federally Recognized Tribes Published April 12, 2012

 
Native American law
Native American-related lists